Davis Weathersby (born c. 1932) is a former American football coach and college athletics administrator. He was the eighth head football coach at Mississippi Valley State University in Itta Bena, Mississippi, serving for eight seasons, from 1970 to 1977, and compiling a record of 33–45.  Weathersby attended Prairie View A&M College of Texas—now known as Prairie View A&M University—lettering in football from 1952 to 1954.  He played as a guard and was team captain in 1954.

Head coaching record

College

References

Year of birth missing (living people)
1930s births
Living people
American football guards
Mississippi Valley State Delta Devils and Devilettes athletic directors
Mississippi Valley State Delta Devils football coaches
Prairie View A&M Panthers football players
College men's track and field athletes in the United States
High school football coaches in Mississippi
Indiana University alumni
People from Liberty, Mississippi
Coaches of American football from Mississippi
Players of American football from Mississippi
African-American coaches of American football
African-American players of American football
20th-century African-American sportspeople
21st-century African-American sportspeople